Paľo Bielik (December 11, 1910 – April 23, 1983), also known as Ján Bukva, was a Slovak film director, screenwriter and actor. He was one of notable personalities in the time of beginnings of Slovak cinematography.

Life
He was born in Banská Bystrica, then part of Austria-Hungary. At the start he played amateur theatre in Banská Bystrica. In the role of Jánošík eponymous game by Jiří Mahen, Karol Plicka noticed him and recommended for the title role in the film Jánošík (1936) to Martin Frič. It was the second film of the legendary story about the famous highwayman. The success of the film led Bielik to a professional theatrical career in the Slovak National Theatre. (1939 - 1941). During the war, he began to deal with short films and in 1945 he became a director of feature films. After his debut he starred in several other films of this important director (Hordubalové, Čapkove poviedky). During the filming of the movie directed by Frinč, which was first ever movie produced in Slovakia, 'Varúj!', Bielik was his co-director and also played one of the main characters. During the war Paľo Bielik began shooting short films, and later devoted himself to the creation of successful full-length shots. Along with Karol Krško he filmed a documentary film 'For freedom', in which were used footage of the Slovak National Uprising.

Bielik worked with an authentic material on his first feature film, 'Vlčie diery', made 1948. The Union of Czechoslovak Army and guerrillas assisted him in creating the film. In the film played a team of excellent actors like Ladislav Slovak Chudík, Joseph Budský, Francis Dibarbora, Ťapák Martin and many others. To the theme of war Paľo Bielik returned in movie 'Štyridsaťštyri' made in 1957. As an award of this movie he received a special honorable mention and the FIPRESCI Prize at the 11th Karlovy Vary International Film Festival in 1958. In 1959 he made the legendary film Captain Dabač, in main role with Ladislav Chudík.
In the sixties, Paľo Bielik revived Jánošík in the third film version, which is the jewel of Slovak cinematography. Movie filmed in 1962 and 1963 on the occasion of the 250th Jánošík death anniversary.
The last movies of Paľo Bielik as a movie director were the dramatic story of Master Executioner (1966) and Three witnesses 1968.
The films of Slovak actor and director were mostly ballad stories of strong, vibrant characters, mostly ended fatally.

Awards
1958 FIPRESCI Prize for film Forty-four (11 IFF Karlovy Vary)
1968 title of national artist

Filmography
1947 Čapek's Tales (1947)
1947 warns ...! (Andrew Muranica)
1935 Jánošík (Juraj Jánošík)

Directed by

1943 Synthetic fibers
1943 The health worker
1943 Under the open sky
1945 For Freedom
1946 Cormorant Island
1947 warns ...!
1948 Vlčie holes
1950 reservoir
1952 Lazy are moved
1954 Friday the thirteenth
1957 Forty-four
1959 Captain Dabač
1962 - 1963 Jánošík
1966 Master Executioner
1968 Three witnesses

scenario

1966 Master Executioner
1963 Jánošík
1957 Forty-four
1948 Vlčie holes

References

External links

1910 births
1983 deaths
People from Banská Bystrica
Slovak film directors